CIF Northern Section (NS) is a governing body of public and private high school athletics in California. Member schools are located in the inland northeastern portion of the state roughly encompassed by the I-5 corridor to the bottom of the Sacramento Valley. It is one of ten sections that compose the California Interscholastic Federation (CIF). Northern Section comprises three conferences National Conference, American Conference, and California Conference. These conferences in turn comprise three leagues. The organization's offices are located in Chico.

Sports

 8-man Football
 Alpine Skiing 
 Baseball
 Basketball
 Cross Country
 Field Hockey
 Football
 Golf
 Soccer	
 Softball	
 Swimming
 Tennis
 Track and Field
 Volleyball
 Wrestling

Conferences
 National Conference (20 schools)
 American Conference (27 schools)
 California Conference (26 schools)

References

External links
 CIF-NS on MaxPreps
 Map of member schools

CIF Northern section